National Highway 516E, commonly called NH 516E is a national highway in  India. It is a spur road of National Highway 16.  NH-516E traverses the state of Andhra Pradesh in India.

Route 
Rajamundry, Junction with SH38/41 south of Rampachodavaram, Koyyuru, Chintapalli, Lambasingi, Vanjari, G.Madugula, Paderu, Araku, Bowadara, Tadipudi,  Vizianagaram.

Junctions  
 
  Terminal in Rajamundry.
  Terminal near Vizianagaram.

See also 
 List of National Highways in India by highway number
 List of National Highways in India by state

References

External links 

 NH 516E on OpenStreetMap

National highways in India
National Highways in Andhra Pradesh